Florentin Dumitru (born 25 May 1977 in Bolintin-Vale) is a Romanian former footballer.

Honours
Steaua București
Romanian Championship League: 2000–01, 2004–05, 2005–06
Petrolul Ploieşti
Romanian Second League: 2010–11

External links
 
 
 

1977 births
Living people
Romanian footballers
Liga I players
FC Astra Giurgiu players
FC Steaua București players
FC Sportul Studențesc București players
CSM Jiul Petroșani players
FC Progresul București players
CS Concordia Chiajna players
FC Petrolul Ploiești players
Romania international footballers
Association football midfielders